Black Oak may refer to:

Places in the United States
 Black Oak, Arkansas
 Black Oak, Daviess County, Indiana
Black Oak, Lake County, Indiana, a neighborhood of Gary, Indiana
 Black Oak, Missouri

Other
 Black Oak Arkansas, American band 
 Black Oak Arkansas (album)
 Black Oak (band), Dutch band
 Black Oak Heritage Park, part of Ojibway Prairie Complex in Windsor, Ontario, Canada
 Blackoak Font, a common typeface